Aag Hi Aag (translation: Fire Everywhere) is a 1987 Bollywood action film directed by Shibu Mitra. It stars Dharmendra, Moushumi Chatterjee, Shatrughan Sinha, Chunky Pandey, Neelam, Richa Sharma, Shakti Kapoor, Danny Denzongpa in pivotal roles, along with Vinod Mehra, Gulshan Grover in guest appearances. The film surfaced as one of the biggest hits of the year, becoming the fourth-highest-grossing film of the year 1987. This film is also known to launch Chunky Pandey's Bollywood career.

Plot
Army Officer Bahadur Singh (Dharmendra) is recalled to duty and on the very day his wife Ganga (Moushumi Chatterjee) gives birth to son Vijay. While back on duty, Bahadur Singh's village is attacked by bandits, his sister is raped and killed. He goes to police to file a complaint, instead of, is shunned by the police, especially, the corrupt Police Inspector Kundan Singh (Gulshan Grover). Enraged, Bahadur Singh takes the law in his hands, joins a gang of bandits lead by Daulat Singh (Danny Denzongpa) and changes his name to Sher Singh.

One day, Sher Singh is shot by police in a village. Then Dr. Raghuveer Singh (Vinod Mehra) comes to treat him, but Sher Singh thinks that Raghuveer Singh is a policeman and kills him. When he realises his mistake, he repents and surrenders to police. Years pass by and Sher Singh's son Vijay (Chunky Pandey) grows up and falls in love with Aarti (Neelam). Aarti is the daughter of Chaudhary, none other than Daulat Singh. On the other side, Suraj Singh (Shatrughan Sinha), the son of Raghuveer Singh, becomes ACP. Suraj has only one mission; find Sher Singh and kill him to take revenge of his father's murder. This gives more twists and turns in the story which leads to a dead end with many people to repent.

Cast 
 Dharmendra as Bahadur Singh / Sher Singh
 Moushumi Chatterjee as Ganga Singh
 Shatrughan Sinha as ACP Suraj Singh
 Chunky Pandey as Vijay Singh
 Neelam as Aarti Chaudhary
 Richa Sharma as Tulsi Singh
 Shakti Kapoor as Gangva
 Danny Denzongpa as Daulat Singh / Chaudhary
 Om Shivpuri as Jailor
 Jagdish Raj as Judge
 Vinod Mehra as Dr. Raghuveer Singh
 Geeta Siddharth as Geeta Singh
 Pinchoo Kapoor as Mahajan of Sonapur
 Tej Sapru as Jeeva
 Mac Mohan as Bhairav
 Gulshan Grover as Inspector Kundan Singh

Soundtrack
Music was composed by Bappi Lahiri.

References

External links 
 

1987 films
1980s Hindi-language films
Films scored by Bappi Lahiri
Films directed by Shibu Mitra
Indian action films